The Washington Apple Commission is a quasi-public body in the United States state of Washington, created by the Revised Code of Washington, which is statutorily authorized to "speak on behalf of the Washington state government with regard to apples and apple-related issues".

The commission is headquartered in Wenatchee, where it also maintains a visitor center which has exhibits on apples and apple harvesting technology. As of 2017 it had an annual budget of approximately $10.4 million. Its president that year was Todd Fryhover.

References

External links
 official website

State agencies of Washington (state)
Apple production in Washington (state)
Organizations based in Washington (state)
Quasi-public entities in the United States